The Heart is the debut solo album of Ours lead singer Jimmy Gnecco. The album was released via Bright Antenna on July 20, 2010.  It was self-produced by Gnecco, who also played every instrument on the album.  "Bring You Home" has been announced as the album's first single. On November 7, 2011, a version of the album with new mixes and a full band was released entitled The Heart X Edition.

Track listing
All songs written by Jimmy Gnecco.
Rest Your Soul - 4:49
Light on the Grave - 4:02
Mystery - 4:40
The Heart - 6:13
Bring You Home - 3:01 
These Are My Hands - 3:21
Days - 3:39
Gravity - 3:50
I Heard You Singing - 4:34
Take a Chance - 3:39
Darling - 5:03
Light on the Grave (Reprise) - 0:51
Patiently Waiting - 3:04
It's Only Love - 3:24
Talk to Me - 5:43
Hello (on Deluxe Edition) - 3:56
A Place In the Sun (on Deluxe Edition) - 3:14

References

2010 albums